“Hymn to Proserpine” is a poem by Algernon Charles Swinburne, published in Poems and Ballads in 1866.  The poem is addressed to the goddess Proserpina, the Roman equivalent of Persephone, but laments the rise of Christianity for displacing the pagan goddess and her pantheon.

The epigraph at the beginning of the poem is the phrase Vicisti, Galilaee, Latin for "You have conquered, O Galilean", the supposed dying words of the Emperor Julian.  He had tried to reverse the official endorsement of Christianity by the Roman Empire.  The poem is cast in the form of a lament by a person professing the paganism of classical antiquity and lamenting its passing, and expresses regret at the rise of Christianity.  Lines 35 and 36 express this best:

Thou hast conquered, O pale Galilean; the world has grown grey from thy breath;
We have drunken of things Lethean, and fed on the fullness of death.

The line "Time and the Gods are at strife" inspired the title of Lord Dunsany's Time and the Gods.

The poem is quoted by Sue Bridehead in Thomas Hardy's 1895 novel, Jude the Obscure and also by Edward Ashburnham in Ford Madox Ford's The Good Soldier.

See also
 “The Garden of Proserpine”, another poem by A. C. Swinburne
 Poems and Ballads

References

External links

Full text at the University of Toronto Library

British poems
1866 poems
Victorian poetry
Proserpina
Works by Algernon Charles Swinburne